Sun Pictures is an Indian film distribution and production studio based in Chennai, India. It is a unit of Sun TV Network a part of the Sun Group. Founded in 2000, it started producing the TV film Siragugal and later it started producing and distributing Tamil-language films.

Filmography

References

External links
 

Film distributors of India
Film production companies of India
Film production companies based in Chennai
Indian film studios
Indian companies established in 2008
Sun Group
2000 establishments in Tamil Nadu